Dragonfly 44 is an ultra diffuse galaxy in the Coma Cluster. This galaxy is well-known because observations of the velocity dispersion in 2016 suggested a mass of about one trillion solar masses, about the same as the Milky Way. This mass was consistent with a count of about 90 and 70 globular clusters observed around Dragonfly 44 in two different studies.

Later, spatially resolved kinematics measured a mass of about 160 billion solar masses, six times less than early mass measurements and one order of magnitude less than the Milky Way's mass. The most recent work found 20 globular clusters around the galaxy, which is consistent with the current mass measurement. The lack of X-ray emission from the galaxy and its surroundings also shows that the number of globular clusters cannot be as many as was claimed before.

The galaxy emits only 1% of the light emitted by the Milky Way. The galaxy was discovered with the Dragonfly Telephoto Array.

Early study 
To determine the amount of dark matter in this galaxy, in 2016, astronomers used the DEIMOS instrument installed on Keck II to measure the velocities of stars for 33.5 hours for six nights so they could determine the galaxy's mass.
The scientists then used the Gemini Multi-Object Spectrograph on the 8-m Gemini North telescope to reveal a halo of spherical clusters of stars around the galaxy's core. Following this observation, in August 2016, astronomers reported that this galaxy might be made almost entirely of dark matter.

See also
 Low Surface Brightness galaxy (LSB galaxy)
 NGC 1052-DF2 – a galaxy thought to contain almost no dark matter.
 Type-cD galaxy or c-Diffuse galaxy type
 Type-D galaxy or Diffuse-type galaxy

References

Galaxies
Coma Cluster
Coma Berenices